Gari is a rural locality (a village) in Osintsevskoye Rural Settlement, Kishertsky District, Perm Krai, Russia. The population was 109 as of 2010.

Geography 
It is located on the Lek River.

References 

Rural localities in Kishertsky District